Houston (I'm Comin' to See You) is the twenty-sixth album by American singer/guitarist Glen Campbell, released in 1974 (see 1974 in music).

Track listing
Side 1:

 "Houston (I'm Comin' to See You)" (David Paich) – 3:21
 "Too Many Mornings" (George Place) – 2:50
 "Lovesick Blues" (Irving Mills, Cliff Friend) – 2:33
 "Yesterday, When I Was Young" (Charles Aznavour, Herbert Kretzmer) – 3:41
 "Lovelight" (Bill C. Graham, Glen Castleberry) – 2:21

Side 2:

 "No Love at All" (Wayne Carson Thompson, Johnny Christopher) – 2:42
 "Honestly Loved" (Graham, Castleberry) – 2:45
 "Bonaparte's Retreat" (Pee Wee King) – 2:48
 "If I Were Loving You" (Graham, Castleberry) – 2:55
 "A Beautiful Love Song" (Graham) – 2:28

Personnel
Glen Campbell – acoustic guitar, electric guitars, bagpipes
Hal Blaine – drums
Joe Osborn – bass guitar
Larry Muhoberac – keyboards
David Paich – keyboards
Dean Parks – acoustic guitar

Production
Producer – Jimmy Bowen
Arranger – Dennis McCarthy
"Houston (I'm Coming to See You)", "Honestly Loved" arranged by Marty Paich
Engineer – John Guess
Art director – Roy Kohara
Illustration – Brian Zick

Charts
Album – Billboard (United States)

Singles – Billboard (United States)

Glen Campbell albums
1974 albums
Capitol Records albums
Albums arranged by Marty Paich
Albums produced by Jimmy Bowen